Jianxi may refer to:

Jianxi (建熙; 360–370), era name used by Murong Wei, last emperor of Former Yan

Places in China
Jianxi District (涧西区), a district of Luoyang, Henan
Jianxi, Anhui (涧溪), a town in Mingguang, Anhui
Jianxi, Fujian (建西), a town in Shunchang County, Fujian

See also
Jiangxi, a province of China
Jiangxi (disambiguation)